Eileen May Hiscock, later Wilson, (25 August 1909 – 3 September 1958) was an English track and field athlete who competed for Great Britain in the 1932 Summer Olympics and in the 1936 Summer Olympics. She was born in Blackheath, London.

At the 1930 Women's World Games in Prague she was a member, along with Ethel Scott, Ivy Walker and Daisy Ridgley, of the British 4×100 metre relay team which won the silver medal. In the 1934 World Women's Games, she won the bronze medals in the 100 metres and 200 metres contests.

In 1932, she was one of five women entered by the Women's Amateur Athletic Association at the 1932 Los Angeles Summer Olympics as Britain's first female Olympians in athletics events, together with Ethel Johnson, Gwendoline Porter, Nellie Halstead, and seventeen-year-old Violet Webb. They sailed for five days from Southampton to Quebec and then travelled a further 3000 miles by train before arriving in Los Angeles. In the 4 x 100 metres women's relay she won the bronze medal with her team mates Gwendoline Porter, Violet Webb (replacing the injured Johnson) and Nellie Halstead. In the women's 100 metres she came 5th.

At the 1934 Empire Games she won the gold medal in the 100 yards competition as well as in the 220 yards contest. She also was a member of the English relay team which won the gold medal in the 110-220-110 yards relay contest and the silver medal in the 220-110-220-110 yards relay competition (with Hiscock, Nellie Halstead, Ethel Johnson and Ivy Walker).

In the 1936 Summer Olympics she won the silver medal with her team mates Violet Olney, Audrey Brown and Barbara Burke in the 4×100 metre relay event. In the 100 metre event she was eliminated in the semi-finals.

She married John H Wilson in 1936.

References

External links
 image Eileen Hiscock, medal ceremony Berlin 1936 (Lewisham's Olympic Legacy)
 image Eileen Hiscock (Athletic Cards.com)
 Images Eileen Hiscock (Getty Images)

1909 births
1958 deaths
English female sprinters
Olympic athletes of Great Britain
Athletes (track and field) at the 1932 Summer Olympics
Athletes (track and field) at the 1936 Summer Olympics
Olympic silver medallists for Great Britain
Olympic bronze medallists for Great Britain
English Olympic medallists
Athletes (track and field) at the 1934 British Empire Games
Commonwealth Games gold medallists for England
Commonwealth Games silver medallists for England
People from Blackheath, London
Place of birth missing
Commonwealth Games medallists in athletics
Medalists at the 1936 Summer Olympics
Medalists at the 1932 Summer Olympics
Olympic silver medalists in athletics (track and field)
Olympic bronze medalists in athletics (track and field)
Women's World Games medalists
Olympic female sprinters
Medallists at the 1934 British Empire Games